Postcard Records is a British, Glasgow-based, independent record label founded by Alan Horne in 1979, as a vehicle for releases by Orange Juice and Josef K. The label's motto was "The Sound of Young Scotland", a parody/tribute to the Motown motto; its logo featured a cartoon cat beating a drum. Although short-lived, Postcard was a key influence on the C81 and the later C86 indie-pop movements.

The label's first release, in spring 1980, was Orange Juice's, "Falling and Laughing", which was jointly financed by Horne and band members Edwyn Collins and bass guitarist David McClymont. The label went on to sign such bands as Aztec Camera and The Go-Betweens, before winding down in 1981 shortly after Orange Juice left to sign a major deal with Polydor. In 1984 Horne then started a new label as part of a deal with London  Records, called Swamplands, releasing a handful of singles before folding. He then resuscitated Postcard in 1992, releasing various new albums and retrospectives until 1997.

The label was profiled in depth in 2015 documentary film, Big Gold Dream, and the 2014 book by Simon Goddard, Simply Thrilled: The Preposterous Story of Postcard Records, although both concentrate largely on the original 1980-81 era of the label, and Alan Horne declined to be involved in either endeavour.

In March 2020, Postcard Records appeared to be showing signs of activity again, via a Twitter account @Dubh18.5. Tweets referencing "some kind of reboot", and various archival footage in a series of GIFs hinting at further releases.

In December 2020, it was announced that the label was being reactivated as "Postcard Recordings Of Scotland Extra Terrestrial" to release a deluxe anthology vinyl boxset of recordings by Paul Quinn & The Independent Group, including a 144 page hard backed book. The boxset was limited to 300 copies only and went on pre-sale via Bandcamp on 2 April 2021. It sold out within 24 hours and was finally delivered to buyers in late July 2021, to universal praise. The box contained re-pressed versions of the two original 1990s LPs along with a new 3rd double LP of unreleased live and studio material, a 10" of other recordings, along with the aforementioned book, and a handmade screenprint.

Postcard Records Discography (1980-1981)

Swamplands Discography (1984–1985)
The source for the information below is the website discogs.com

 SWP 1 Paul Quinn and Edwyn Collins – "Pale Blue Eyes"   7"  (1984)
 SWP 2 Patti Palladin and Johnny Thunders – "Crawfish"   7"  (1984) (unreleased)
 SWP 3 James King and The Lonewolves - "The Angels Know" 7"  (1985)
 SWP 4 Memphis – "You Supply The Roses"   7"  (1985)
 SWP 5 Win – "Unamerican Broadcasting"   7"  (1985)
 SWP 6 Paul Quinn – "Ain't That Always The Way"   7"  (1985)
 SWP 7 James King and The Lonewolves – "Flyaway"   7"  (1985) (unreleased)
 SWP 8 Win – "You've Got The Power"   7"  (1985)

Postcard Records Discography (1992–1997)
The source for the information below is the website discogs.com

 DUBH 921 Paul Quinn And The Independent Group – "The Phantoms and the Archetypes"   LP  (1992)
 DUBH 922 Orange Juice – "Ostrich Churchyard"   LP  (1992)
 DUBH 931 The Nectarine No. 9 – "A Sea With Three Stars"   LP  (1993)
 DUBH 932 Orange Juice – "The Heathers On Fire"   LP  (1993)
 DUBH 933 Paul Quinn And The Independent Group – "Stupid Thing"   EP  (1993)
 DUBH 934 Orange Juice – "Blue Boy"   EP  (1993)
 DUBH 935 Paul Quinn And The Independent Group – "Road Song, Road Movie, Road Song" EP  (1993) (Unreleased)
 DUBH 936 Vic Godard – "End Of The Surrey People"   LP  (1993)
 DUBH 937 Vic Godard – "Won't Turn Back"   EP  (1993)
 DUBH 939 The Nectarine No. 9 – "Un-Loaded For You"   EP  (1993)
 DUBH 9315 Various – "D'Un Échantillon De Marchandises"   EP  (1993)
 DUBH 941 The Nectarine No. 9 – "Guitar Thieves"   LP  (1994)
 DUBH 942 The Nectarine No. 9 – "This Arsehole's Been Burned Too Many Times Before"   7"  (1994)
 DUBH 945 Paul Quinn And The Independent Group – "Will I Ever Be Inside of You"   LP  (1994)
 DUBH 951 The Nectarine No. 9 – "Saint Jack"   LP  (1995)
 DUBH 952 Paul Quinn, The Nectarine No 9, Jock Scot – "Pregnant With Possibilities (Volume One)"   EP  (1995)
 DUBH 972 Jock Scot – "My Personal Culloden"   LP  (1997)

Postcard Records Discography (2021)
The source for the information below is the website discogs.com

 DUBH 18.5 Paul Quinn And The Independent Group – "Unadulterated/Unincorporated"  Vinyl Boxset  (2021)

Postcard Records Miscellaneous 
 POSP 357 Orange Juice – "L.O.V.E. Love"   7"  (1981)
 POLS 1057 Orange Juice – "You Can't Hide Your Love Forever"   LP  (1982)
 POSP 386 Orange Juice – "Felicity"   7"  (1982)
The above releases all had the Postcard drumming kitten logo on sleeve and label. The 7" catalogue numbers were prefixed POS(tcard)P(olydor)

See also
 List of record labels
 List of independent UK record labels

References

External links
Official Postcard Records Website

Stylus article
TweeNet article

British independent record labels
Record labels established in 1979
Alternative rock record labels